Generation-i is the fourth studio album by Australian rock band, 1927, released in August 2013. It was their first studio since 1927 in 1992. The physical version appeared with a bonus DVD with eight live tracks, filmed during the 2012 Roxette tour at Rod Laver Arena (Melbourne), Challenger Stadium (Perth) and Brisbane Entertainment Centre (Brisbane). 1927 promoted the album with an Australian tour from June to September and with Belinda Carlisle from October to December 2013.

Track listing
CD/DD 
 "Nobody Knows" (Eric Weideman) - 7:00
 "Somewhere Before" (Eric Weideman, Simon Shapiro) - 4:27
 "Generation I" (Eric Weideman) - 2:01
 "The Story Never Ends" (Eric Weideman) - 5:34
 "All That I Touch" (Eric Weideman) - 4:44
 "Generation Y" (Eric Weideman) - 2:22
 "Stop The World " (Eric Weideman, Simon Shapiro) - 4:51
 "The Hell of It" (Eric Weideman) - 5:16
 "Stop" (Eric Weideman) - 4:18
 "City Talks" (Simon Shapiro) - 4:23
 "Believe in Your Own Lies" (Simon Shapiro) - 3:57
 "Generation X" (Eric Weideman) - 1:53
 "Fright of Your Life" (Eric Weideman) - 3:46
 "Where You Are" (Eric Weideman, Simon Shapiro) - 4:27

Bonus DVD (Limited Edition)
 "Fright of Your Life"	
 "To Love Me"	
 "Don't Forget Me"	
 "You'll Never Know"	
 "Tell Me a Story"	
 "Compulsory Hero"	
 "If I Could"	
 "That's When I Think of You"

Charts

Release history

References

2013 albums
1927 (band) albums
Sony Music Australia albums